"I Love You" is a song by the Climax Blues Band, released as a single in 1980, from the album Flying the Flag.

Chart performance
The song was the group second-biggest hit (after 1976's "Couldn't Get It Right"), entering the U.S. Billboard Hot 100 in February 1981, peaking at No. 12 in June, and spending 27 weeks on the chart, and also reached No. 20 on the Adult Contemporary chart.

"I Love You" was the 20th biggest hit of 1981. On the Cash Box Top 100, "I Love You" peaked for two weeks at number 9.

Weekly singles charts

Year-end charts

Credits
Nicky Hopkins played electric piano throughout the whole song; string arrangements were provided by David Campbell.

Other versions
"I Love You" song was covered by American band Lazlo Bane for their 2007 album Guilty Pleasures.

It was covered by the band Nine Days for the soundtrack album to the film The New Guy, and by the band Tesla for their 2011 acoustic album Twisted Wires & the Acoustic Sessions.

"I Love You" was also covered by the band the H Factor, and was released as a single, from their 1989 sole eponymous album. Two members of the H Factor, Pete Haycock and Derek Holt, were members of the Climax Blues Band before forming the H Factor with Steve Hunter. Holt also recorded his own version of the song on the 1999 album After the Climax - I Love You.

In popular culture
The song is featured at the end scene of the 2002 Robin Tunney indie-comedy film Cherish.

References

1981 songs
1981 singles
1980s ballads
Climax Blues Band songs
Rock ballads
Warner Records singles
Songs about marriage